Hans G. Knoll (1914–1955) was a German-American who, together with his wife, Florence Knoll, founded Knoll, the well-known design company and furniture manufacturer.

Biography
Hans Knoll was born in Germany in 1914.  His father was a modern furniture manufacturer, who supported the Nazi regime. Perhaps because of his father's views, or perhaps because he wanted to follow many other German modernists who had emigrated, Knoll left Germany in 1936, and first moved to England. In 1938, he moved to New York City to found a furniture manufacturing company of his own.  In 1941, he paired with furniture designer Jens Risom to launch the Hans Knoll Furniture Company. Risom designed 15 of the 20 pieces of furniture in the Hans Knoll Furniture Company's "600" line, which began production in 1941.

In 1943, Knoll was approached by Florence Schust, an architect who had studied under Ludwig Mies van der Rohe and Eliel Saarinen.  Schust convinced Knoll that she could help bring in business to his company even in America's wartime economy by expanding into interior design and working with architects. With her architectural background and design flair, she succeeded. Knoll fell in love with Schust, and in 1946 they were married.  At that time, they changed the name of the company to Knoll Associates.

In 1943 Knoll assisted the war effort by helping the US Air Force construct the German Village, a simulation of German working class dwellings to be used to perfect fire-bombing techniques on German residential areas.

The Knolls determined that, although they were focused on modern design, they would also abide by the values of the Bauhaus: design excellence, technological innovation and mass production.  They paid royalties to their designers based on how well the designer's furniture sold, a practice that was innovative at the time.  In this way, they were able to attract the design services of Harry Bertoia and Eliel Saarinen.  Knoll Associates also acquired the rights to the Barcelona chair designed by Ludwig Mies van der Rohe.

In 1945, Knoll launched its Knoll Planning Unit under Florence's direction.  She also launched a textiles division in 1947.

Knoll moved the firm's headquarters to Pennsylvania in 1950, believing that he would be able to find talented craftsmen among the region's large German population.

Knoll's sales force included Irving Blum, who was soon to become Andy Warhol's dealer for the groundbreaking Campbell's Soup Can show at the Ferus Gallery in Los Angeles in 1962.

Knoll had his Porsche sent to Cuba for a business trip, and died in a car crash with a runaway truck in 1955 at the age of 41. He was survived by his widow Florence who became president of their company and his two children from an earlier marriage, Peter Knoll and Maria (Maja) Knoll.

References

External links 
Profile from R Gallery

1914 births
1955 deaths
American businesspeople
German emigrants to the United States